Superior Energy Services, Inc. is a C-corporation that operates as a holding company for a portfolio of oilfield rentals and well services brands. The Company restructured in 2021 and is not listed on an exchange. Its majority beneficial owners as of March 4, 2022, per the latest filings with the Securities and Exchange Commission, are GoldenTree Asset Management LP and Monarch GP LLC.

Superior is headquartered in Houston, Texas. Its business units are strategically located in North America and internationally in order to serve its oil gas company customers.

Portfolio of Brands

Rentals 
Superior has three business units that provide oilfield rentals ranging from premium tubulars to highly specialized downhole tools and accessories.

 Workstrings International
 Stabil Drill
 HB Rentals

Services 
Superior has forty-three  business units that provide specialized solutions for drilling, production,

completion and decommissioning.

 Superior Completion Services
 Wild Well Control 
 International Snubbing Services (ISS)

History
The company was founded in 1989 by Terence Hall, a native of Louisiana. It had an initial public offering in 1995, when it became listed on the New York Stock Exchange. Hall remained CEO of the company until he stepped down in 2010 and was replaced by current CEO David Dunlap.

In 2005, in response to Hurricane Katrina, the Company launched a Catastrophic Relief Fund to provide grants to employees who experience property damage and other losses during emergencies and natural disasters. Since its inception, the Fund has granted more than 500 awards totaling nearly $1.4 million. In 2021, when many employees experienced losses during winter storm Uri and Hurricane Ida, the Fund made 52 grants totaling $188,865.

In 2012, the company grew significantly with its acquisition of Complete Production Services for approximately $2.7 billion.

In 2012, the Company implemented the Target Zero Safety Management System to manage its global approach to Health, Safety, Environment, and Quality (HSEQ) and meet applicable regulations and client HSEQ requirements.

In 2014, the Company established Shared Core Values that aligned with the Company's existing Code of Conduct and applied to all directors, officers, and employees of the Company.

In 2020, the Company and certain of its subsidiaries announced their intent to file for Chapter 11 protective bankruptcy which was approved in January 2021.

On January 21, 2022, Superior released a PR announcing the appointment of Brian K. Moore as President and CEO. Mr. Moore had previously held the position of Senior Executive Vice President at Superior for 16 years. Brian has 40 years of experience in oilfield services with roles that include Chief Operating Officer at Complete Production Services.

On February 3, 2021, Superior Energy released a press release stating the company had emerged from bankruptcy.

On February 4, 2021, Superior Energy stock, under symbol SPNX, was deleted, and became worthless. This had been foretold by the company in documents filed by the company with the U.S. Securities and Exchange Commission as part of its bankruptcy process.

On March 22, 2021, Superior Energy announced the removal of CEO David Dunlap and CFO Wesley Ballard.

In 2021, as part of a transformation initiative, the Company divested certain of its North American labor-intensive businesses.

In November 2022, Superior Energy engaged ClimeCo, a global sustainability company, to help establish the Company’s ESG reporting platform.

References

External links 
 Company Website

Oil companies of the United States
Companies based in Houston
Companies formerly listed on the New York Stock Exchange
Companies that filed for Chapter 11 bankruptcy in 2020
Energy companies established in 1989
Non-renewable resource companies established in 1989